Cercosaura phelpsorum is a species of lizard in the family Gymnophthalmidae. The species is endemic to Venezuela.

Etymology
The specific name, phelpsorum (genitive plural), is in honor of American ornithologist William H. Phelps Sr. and his family.

Geographic range
C. phelpsorum is found in the Venezuelan states of Amazonas and Bolívar.

Habitat

Reproduction
C. phelpsorum is oviparous.

References

Further reading
Doan TM (2003). "A new phylogenetic classification for the gymnophthalmid genera Cercosaura, Pantodactylus and Prionodactylus (Reptilia: Squamata)". Zoological Journal of the Linnean Society 137 (1): 101–115. (Cercosaura phelpsorum, new combination).
Lancini AR (1968). "El genero Euspondylus (Sauria: Teiidae) en Venezuela ". Publicaciones Ocasionales del Museo de Ciencias Naturales, Caracas 12: 1–8. (Euspondylus phelpsi, new species). (in Spanish).
Myers CW, Donnelly MA (1996). "A New Herpetofauna from Cerro Yaví, Venezuela: First Results of the Robert G. Goelet American Museum – Terramar Expedition to the Northwestern Tepuis". American Museum Novitates (3172): 1-56. (Euspondylus phelpsorum, emendation, p. 23; E. goeleti, new species, pp. 23–30, Figures 16–20).

Cercosaura
Reptiles of Venezuela
Endemic fauna of Venezuela
Reptiles described in 1968
Taxa named by Abdem Ramón Lancini Villalaz
Fauna of the Tepuis